Carl Baily Norris von Schirach (10 November 1873 in Kiel – 11 July 1948) was a German-American theatre director. He was head of the Weimar Court Theatre from 1909 to 1918. He was also a chamberlain at the grand ducal court in the Grand Duchy of Saxony, and was a retired captain of the cavalry (Rittmeister).

Carl von Schirach was born an American citizen and was the son of Karl Friedrich von Schirach, a former major in the US Army who fought in the American Civil War on the Union side and who was an honour guard at President Abraham Lincoln's funeral in 1865. His mother was Elisabeth Baily Norris, a member of a prominent Philadelphia family. Carl von Schirach married the American Emma Middleton Lynah Tillou (1872–1944), who also belonged to a prominent Philadelphia family and who was descended from two signatories of the American Declaration of Independence. They were the parents of the opera singer Rosalind von Schirach and of the Nazi youth leader Baldur von Schirach.

References 

German theatre directors
German military officers
German untitled nobility
German people of American descent
Carl
1873 births
1948 deaths